is a Japanese anime screenwriter. She debuted as a screenwriter in 2001, and in 2006 got to become the lead screenwriter for the first time with Ramen Fighter Miki. Since Ramen Fighter Miki, she has done screenwriting for many works, such as Lucky Star, Show by Rock!!, and Battle Game in 5 Seconds.

Works

TV series
 Ramen Fighter Miki (2006) (screenwriter)
 Lucky Star (2007) (screenwriter)
 Allison & Lillia (2008) (screenwriter)
 Tears to Tiara (2009) (screenwriter)
 GA Geijutsuka Art Design Class (2009) (screenwriter)
 Ōkami Kakushi (2010) (screenwriter)
 Battle Girls: Time Paradox (2011) (screenwriter)
 The Everyday Tales of a Cat God (2011) (screenwriter)
 The Idolmaster (2011) (screenwriter)
 Amnesia (2013) (screenwriter)
 Karneval (2013) (screenwriter)
 Inari, Konkon, Koi Iroha (2014) (screenwriter)
 Wake Up, Girls! (2014–2015) (screenwriter)
 Chaika: The Coffin Princess (2014) (screenwriter)
 Dramatical Murder (2014) (screenwriter)
 The Disappearance of Nagato Yuki-chan (2015) (screenwriter)
 Show by Rock!! (2015–2021) (screenwriter)
 Endride (2016) (screenwriter)
 Chain Chronicle: Light of Haecceitas (2017) (screenwriter)
 Akashic Records of Bastard Magic Instructor (2017) (screenwriter)
 Dive!! (2017) (screenwriter)
 A Centaur's Life (2017) (screenwriter)
 Happy Sugar Life (2018) (screenwriter)
 Harukana Receive (2018) (screenwriter)
 Are You Lost? (2019) (screenwriter)
 Kemono Michi: Rise Up (2019) (screenwriter)
 Smile Down the Runway (2020) (screenwriter)
 Tamayomi (2020) (screenwriter)
 Maesetsu! (2020) (screenwriter)
 Iwa-Kakeru! Climbing Girls (2020) (screenwriter)
 Life Lessons with Uramichi Oniisan (2021) (screenwriter)
 Battle Game in 5 Seconds (2021) (screenwriter)
 PuraOre! Pride of Orange (2021) (screenwriter)
 My Master Has No Tail (2022) (screenwriter)
 I've Somehow Gotten Stronger When I Improved My Farm-Related Skills (2022) (screenwriter)
 Farming Life in Another World (2023) (screenwriter)
 The Reincarnation of the Strongest Exorcist in Another World (2023) (screenwriter)

Web series
 7 Seeds (2019–2020) (screenwriter)
 SD Gundam World Sangoku Soketsuden (2019–2021) (screenwriter)
 High-Rise Invasion (2021) (screenwriter)
 Pole Princess!! (2023) (screenwriter)

References

External links
 

Anime screenwriters
Japanese screenwriters
Japanese women screenwriters
Living people
People from Aichi Prefecture
Year of birth missing (living people)